Soubam Suresh Singh (born 1 March 1980) is an Indian boxer. He competed in the men's light flyweight event at the 2000 Summer Olympics.

References

1980 births
Living people
Indian male boxers
Olympic boxers of India
Boxers at the 2000 Summer Olympics
Place of birth missing (living people)
Light-flyweight boxers